Dun Borrafiach is an Iron Age broch located on the north coast of the island of Skye, in Scotland.

Location
Dun Borrafiach is located on the Waternish peninsula of Skye, about 8 kilometres northwest of the village of Lusta. It occupies a rocky outcrop overlooking the Borrafiach Burn.

Description
Dun Borrafiach has an external diameter of 16.5 metres, and the walls still stand to a height of 2.7 metres on the south side. The entrance is on the northwest side of the broch. The northeast side of the entrance-way appears to have been narrowed in antiquity by the insertion of additional walling. Inside the broch, a long stretch of the outer face of the intramural gallery is still visible on the east side.

References

External links

Brochs in the Isle of Skye
Scheduled monuments in Scotland